Misterton is a village and civil parish  south-east of Crewkerne, Somerset, England.

History

The village was previously known as Minsterton as a result of its links with the "mother church" in Crewkerne.

The parish was part of the hundred of Crewkerne.

Governance

The parish council has responsibility for local issues, including setting an annual precept (local rate) to cover the council's operating costs and producing annual accounts for public scrutiny. The parish council evaluates local planning applications and works with the local police, district council officers, and neighbourhood watch groups on matters of crime, security, and traffic. The parish council's role also includes initiating projects for the maintenance and repair of parish facilities, as well as consulting with the district council on the maintenance, repair, and improvement of highways, drainage, footpaths, public transport, and street cleaning. Conservation matters (including trees and listed buildings) and environmental issues are also the responsibility of the council.

The village falls within the Non-metropolitan district of South Somerset, which was formed on 1 April 1974 under the Local Government Act 1972, having previously been part of Chard Rural District. The district council is responsible for local planning and building control, local roads, council housing, environmental health, markets and fairs, refuse collection and recycling, cemeteries and crematoria, leisure services, parks, and tourism.

Somerset County Council is responsible for running the largest and most expensive local services such as education, social services, libraries, main roads, public transport, policing and fire services, trading standards, waste disposal and strategic planning.

It is also part of the Yeovil county constituency represented in the House of Commons of the Parliament of the United Kingdom. It elects one Member of Parliament (MP) by the first past the post system of election.

Transport

The village is the site of Crewkerne railway station on the Exeter- London Waterloo line served by South West Trains. It also lies at the crossroads of the A356 and A3066 roads. The village is served by the Taunton-Chard-Crewkerne-Misterton-Yeovil bus service operated by Stagecoach and Bridport-Beaminster-Broadwindsor-Misterton-Crewkerne-Yeovil bus service operated by Damory. Both services operate Monday to Saturday.

Landmarks

The manor house dates from the 18th century and was part of a major house which formerly incorporated Little Manor and West Manor.

The Old Court and Court Close, with Court Place and Old Court Cottage date from the 16th century and were two houses which were subsequently linked to form one and have now been extended and then subdivided again.

The Globe Inn dates from the 17th century.

Religious sites

The Church of St Leonard was built of hamstone in 1840 by Sampson Kempthorne. It has been designated by English Heritage as a Grade II listed building.

Notable residents

 Ellen Buckingham Mathews (1853 - 1920) an English novelist under the pen name Helen Mathers was born in the village.

References

External links

Villages in South Somerset
Civil parishes in Somerset